Confidence is a novel by Henry James, first published as a serial in Scribner's Monthly in 1879 and then as a book later the same year. This light and somewhat awkward comedy centers on artist Bernard Longueville, scientist Gordon Wright, and the sometimes inscrutable heroine, Angela Vivian. The plot rambles through various romantic entanglements before reaching an uncomplicated, but still believable happy ending.

Plot summary 

While sketching in Siena, Bernard Longueville meets Angela Vivian and her mother. Later, Bernard's friend and self-proclaimed "mad" scientist Gordon Wright calls Longueville to Baden-Baden to pass judgment on whether he should marry Angela. Bernard recommends against it, based on his belief that Angela is something of a mysterious coquette.

So Gordon marries the lightweight (in both senses) Blanche Evers. After a couple years Longueville again meets Angela at a French beach resort and realizes he loves her. They get engaged, and Angela tells Bernard that she had refused Gordon when he proposed to her. Eventually Angela manages to reconcile Gordon and Blanche, who were becoming estranged due to a supposed extramarital affair Blanche had. Everybody lives happily ever after.

Major themes 
It may well be futile to look for themes in this account of rather entangled romances. The book only seems to say that people can always deceive themselves and life can't be regulated on "scientific" principles, which falls on the shoulders of Gordon as a main character.

Some have suggested that the contrast between scientist Wright and artist Longueville reflects the difference between William and Henry James. That's always a possibility, of course, but the book makes little of the comparison, instead preferring to make new connections between the two heroes. Angela's interventions at the book's conclusion, where she tidies up everybody's lives and makes things just perfect, some critics deem unbelievable.

References 
 The Novels of Henry James by Edward Wagenknecht (New York: Frederick Ungar Publishing Co., 1983) 
 The Novels of Henry James by Oscar Cargill (New York: Macmillan Co., 1961)

External links

 Original magazine publication of Confidence (1879)
 First American book version of Confidence (1880)
 Note on the various texts of Confidence at the Library of America web site
 

1879 British novels
1879 American novels
Novels by Henry James
Novels first published in serial form
Works originally published in Scribner's Magazine
Novels about artists
Chatto & Windus books